The 1952 Minnesota gubernatorial election took place on November 4, 1952. Republican Party of Minnesota candidate C. Elmer Anderson defeated Minnesota Democratic–Farmer–Labor Party challenger Orville Freeman.

Results

See also
 List of Minnesota gubernatorial elections

External links
 http://www.sos.state.mn.us/home/index.asp?page=653
 http://www.sos.state.mn.us/home/index.asp?page=657

Minnesota
Gubernatorial
1952
November 1952 events in the United States